Sardar Abdul Rahim Durrani (1922–2007) was a brigadier of Pakistan Army who  served as Governor of Baluchistan province of Pakistan from 1994 to 1995.

Mr. Durrani was born in 1922 in Quetta. He joined  Pakistan army in 1944. During his 35 years service, he worked  in various capacities and reached the rank of brigadier until his retirement in 1979.  He has three sons, Colonel (retd) Sardar Amjad Naeem Durrani, Nadim Durrani and Imran Durani, and daughter Nilofar Niazi.
He died on 24 June 2007 in Quetta Cantonment at the age of 85.

See also 
Governor of Baluchistan

References 

People from Quetta
1922 births
2007 deaths
Governors of Balochistan, Pakistan
Pakistan Army personnel